The National Congress Party of Afghanistan ( Hezb-e Kongrā-ye Mīllī-ye Afghānestān)  is a liberal, secular and anti-Pashtun nationalist political party in Afghanistan. The party was formed in 2004 and, is the only major opposition party that is not linked to an armed group. The leader of this party is Latīf Pedrām who was an opponent of the communist, Islamist and Taliban regimes. Pedram is also a critic of Hamid Karzai's government. As the party leader, Pedram, was a candidate in Afghanistan's 2004 presidential election and received the fifth most votes. Unlike other political parties in Afghanistan, the National Congress of Afghanistan has remained firm and united. Latīf Pedrām is a strong supporter of secularism, federalism and decentralization in Afghanistan. He denounces corruption and strongly opposes Islamic fundamentalism. He advocates an independent, but decentralized Afghanistan, and believes that the country should be divided into autonomous regions under the control of regional capitals.

References

External links
Official web site 

Political parties in Afghanistan
Liberalism in Afghanistan
Secularism in Afghanistan
Secularist organizations
Anti-clerical parties
Liberal parties
Federalist parties
Political parties of minorities